Senanayake or Senanayaka is a Sinhalese surname. Notable people with the surname include:

Notable people
 Charith Senanayake (born 1962), Sri Lankan cricketer
 D. S. Senanayake (1884–1952), Ceylonese politician
 Dudley Senanayake (1911–1973), Ceylonese politician
 E. L. Senanayake (born 1920), Sri Lankan politician
 Edirisinghe Senanayake (born 1970), Sri Lankan shooter
 Florence Senanayake, Ceylonese politician
 Fredrick Richard Senanayake (1882–1926), Ceylonese lawyer and politician
 G. B. Senanayake (1913–1985), Sri Lankan writer
 Maithripala Senanayake (1916–1998), Ceylonese politician
Mollie Dunuwila Senanayake, Ceylonese political figure
 Nimal Senanayake, Sri Lankan physician and academic
 Richard Gotabhaya Senanayake (1911–1970), Ceylonese politician
 Rosy Senanayake (born 1958), Sri Lankan activist and politician
 Rukman Senanayake (born 1948), Sri Lankan politician
 Sachithra Senanayake (born 1985), Sri Lankan cricketer
 Wasantha Senanayake (born 1973), Sri Lankan politician
 Wilfred Senanayake (1918–2008), Ceylonese politician

See also
 
 

Sinhalese surnames